Olumide Larry Ogunjobi (born June 3, 1994) is an American football defensive end for the Pittsburgh Steelers of the National Football League (NFL). He played college football at Charlotte, and was selected by the Cleveland Browns in the third round of the 2017 NFL Draft. He has previously played for the Cincinnati Bengals.

High school and college career
Ogunjobi was born in Livingston, New Jersey, to Yoruba parents who had immigrated from Nigeria. He attended Ragsdale High School in Jamestown, North Carolina. From 2013 to 2016 he played college football at Charlotte, recording 217 tackles and 13 sacks.  At Charlotte, he double-majored in computer science and biology,
graduating with a degree in computer science in December 2016.

Professional career
Coming out of college, Ogunjobi was ranked as the 15th best defensive tackle in the draft by CBSSports.com and was projected to be a fifth or sixth-round pick. He received an invitation to the 2017 Senior Bowl, practiced well throughout the week, and played defensive tackle for the North who lost 16–15 to the South. Ogunjobi raised his draft stock after showcasing his talent in the Senior Bowl. He participated at the NFL Combine and completed all the required combine and positional drills. About a dozen or more scouts and representatives attended Charlotte's Pro Day to scout Ogunjobi as the feature prospect and two other teammates. NFL draft experts and analysts projected him to be a second or third-round pick. He was ranked as the third-best defensive tackle in the draft by ESPN, was ranked the fourth-best defensive tackle by NFLDraftScout.com, was ranked the fifth-best defensive tackle by NFL analyst Mike Mayock, and was ranked the sixth-best defensive tackle by Sports Illustrated.

Cleveland Browns
The Cleveland Browns selected Ogunjobi in the third round (65th overall) of the 2017 NFL Draft. Ogunjobi signed his contract with the Browns on May 17, 2017, a deal which totaled $3.9 million.

On November 14, 2019, near the end of a game against Pittsburgh Steelers, teammate Myles Garrett and Steelers quarterback Mason Rudolph got tangled up and began fighting, ending with Garrett hitting Rudolph with a helmet. As other teammates began running towards the two, Ogunjobi hit Rudolph, who was still without his helmet, from behind knocking him onto the ground. He was later suspended for one game without pay and fined.

Cincinnati Bengals
On March 19, 2021, Ogunjobi signed a one-year contract with the Cincinnati Bengals. He started 16 games in 2021, recording a career-high seven sacks, 49 tackles, and a team-high 12 tackles for loss. In the wild card playoff game with the Las Vegas Raiders he suffered a season ending foot injury that required surgery. 

On March 14, 2022, Ogunjobi was reported and expected to sign with the Chicago Bears, but failed the conditional physical, resulting in the offer being rescinded.

Pittsburgh Steelers
On June 21, 2022, Ogunjobi signed a one-year deal with the Pittsburgh Steelers. He started 16 games in 2022, recording 48 tackles and 1.5 sacks.

On March 17, 2023, Ogunjobi signed a three-year, $28.75 million contract extension with the Steelers.

References

External links
Charlotte 49ers bio
Cleveland Browns bio

1994 births
Living people
American football defensive tackles
American sportspeople of Nigerian descent
Charlotte 49ers football players
Cincinnati Bengals players
Cleveland Browns players
People from Livingston, New Jersey
Pittsburgh Steelers players
Players of American football from New Jersey
Players of American football from Greensboro, North Carolina
Sportspeople from Essex County, New Jersey
Yoruba sportspeople